Lichnomesopsyche is an extinct genus of mesopsychid mecopteran which existed in what is now China during the middle Jurassic period. It was found in the Daohugou Bed. It was named by Ren Dong, Conrad C. Labandeira and Shih ChungKun  in 2010. Three species have been named, which can be distinguished by their differing male genitalia.

References

Mecoptera
Middle Jurassic insects
Fossil taxa described in 2010
Jurassic insects of Asia
Prehistoric insect genera